The Lucas Oil 250 was a NASCAR Craftsman Truck Series stock car race held at Mesa Marin Raceway, in Bakersfield, California. One of the inaugural events of the series from its 1995 season, it was one of two races at the track in 1995, and then was the series' lone annual event at the track from 1996 to 2001, then after skipping the 2002 season was run once more in the spring of 2003, the series' final visit to the track. In addition, the track hosted the first series exhibition race in 1994, a 20-lap,  event won by P. J. Jones. Points-paying events were 200 laps in 1995, 300 laps from 1996 to 1999, and 250 laps from 2000 to 2003; the event changed from running in the fall to a spring race in 1999.

Mike Skinner and Dennis Setzer each won the event twice, the only drivers to win more than once; drivers who scored their first series wins at the track were Randy Tolsma in 1997, and Setzer in 1998.

Past winners

1994: Exhibition race
1999 and 2003: Race extended due to a green–white–checker finish.

Multiple winners (drivers)

Multiple winners (teams)

Manufacturer wins

References

External links
 

1994 establishments in California
2003 disestablishments in California
Former NASCAR races
 
Recurring events disestablished in 2003
Recurring sporting events established in 1994